The 2017–18 Ligue 1 Mauritania season is the 38th season of the premier football league in Mauritania. It began on 30 September 2017 and ended on 10 June 2018.

Final standings

See also
2018 Coupe du Président de la République

References

Mauritanian Premier League seasons
Premier League
Premier League
Mauritania